The Hawk Flies High is a 1957 album by jazz tenor saxophonist Coleman Hawkins. Apart from Barry Galbraith and Jo Jones on guitar and drums, the line-up of his accompanying sextet had a bebop background, namely J.J. Johnson on trombone, Idrees Sulieman on trumpet, pianist Hank Jones, and Oscar Pettiford on bass.

Track listing
"Chant" (Hank Jones) – 5:08
"Juicy Fruit" (Idrees Sulieman) – 11:16
"Think Deep" (William O. Smith) – 3:24
"Laura" (David Raksin, Johnny Mercer) – 4:34
"Blue Lights" (Gigi Gryce) – 5:44
"Sancticity" (Hawkins) – 9:10

Personnel 
Coleman Hawkins – tenor saxophone
Hank Jones – piano
Oscar Pettiford – Bass
Jo Jones – Drums
Barry Galbraith – guitar
J.J. Johnson – trombone
Idrees Sulieman – trumpet

References

1957 albums
Coleman Hawkins albums
Original Jazz Classics albums
Riverside Records albums